V. S. Surekha (born ) is an Indian pole vaulter. She holds the current national record of 4.15 m set at National Open Championships held at New Delhi in 2014. Surekha is the first Indian female pole vaulter to clear 4.00 meters.

Early life
Surekha was born in the southern state of Kerala. Her interest in sports started during her childhood as a long jumper. During high school she started practicing pole vault under Coach Nagaraj of Prime Sports Academy in Chennai and with technical help from former pole vaulter Manick Raj, she was able to train for the national Level.

Career
She set her first national record of 3.51 m,at the 43rd Open National Athletic Championship in Bangalore on 28 September 2003.  She bettered the record clearing 4.15 meters at the National Open Championships in New Delhi, in November 2014.

She has represented India at Doha Asian Games in 2006 and Asian Championship Guangzhou in November 2009. A summary of performance of the athlete is given in Table 1.

Personal life
She is married to the triple jumper and Indian National record holder Renjith Maheshwary and is a mother of two daughters Jiya and Sparsha. She set the national record of 4.15m in 2014 when she was the mother of a four-year-old daughter

She is an employee of Southern Railways

References

External links

1984 births
Living people
Indian female pole vaulters
Sportswomen from Kerala
Malayali people
Female pole vaulters
Athletes (track and field) at the 2006 Asian Games
Indian female athletes
21st-century Indian women
21st-century Indian people
Asian Games competitors for India